Acharya Atre Nagar is a monorail station on Line 1 of the Mumbai Monorail located at KP Munot Nagar in the Antop Hill suburb of Mumbai, India. Lies on the Shaikh Mishree Marg which locates at Antop Hill.

References 

Mumbai Monorail stations
Railway stations in India opened in 2019